Moock is a surname. Notable people with the surname include:

Alastair Moock (born 1973), American singer-songwriter
Colin Moock, Canadian writer, tutor, and programmer
Joe Moock (born 1944), American baseball player

See also
Mock (surname)